Polpoda is a genus of flowering plants belonging to the family Molluginaceae.

Its native range is South African Republic.

Species:

Polpoda capensis 
Polpoda stipulacea

References

Molluginaceae
Caryophyllales genera